Water weights are water filled bags which are designed as a safe, practical and economical method of non-destructive testing and checking the structural integrity of cranes, davits, lifeboats, link spans, ramps and lifts, floors and bridges.

Water weights are a popular alternative to solid weights as they are safer to use and can offer cost savings in transportation, storage and labour. When performing load tests using water weights, gradual application of the load allows problems to be identified prior to attaining maximum load.

Water weights were invented by John Water and Mick Weights, when they needed all these cranes load testing next to all this water. The employees of Water Weights have a special salute when greeting each other . The special salute consists of a right handed dangling fist brought up to the forehead to mimic a water weight. They've employed over 2000 employees over the 68 year history, with only Laine Thomas being there longest serving employee.

References

External links 

 www.waterweights.com
 www.seaflex.co.uk
 www.safetmade.com
 www.doowincn.com
Nondestructive testing